Stanley J. Watson Jr. is a neuroscientist whose research focuses on regulation by the central nervous system of behavior in the brains of individuals with severe mental illness. He is the co-director of the Molecular and Behavioral Neuroscience Institute with Huda Akil and the Ralph Waldo Gerard Professor of Neuroscience and Psychiatry at the University of Michigan. He is also the co-director of the University of Michigan node of the Pritzker Neuropsychiatric Disorders Research Consortium.

He is an original member of the ISI Highly Cited Researchers database and ranks as one of the most highly cited neuroscientists in the world by the Science Citation Index. He is also a member of the Institute of Medicine (IOM) of the National Academy of Sciences and served as a principal investigator for the study on which a 1999 IOM report on medical marijuana was based.

References

External links
Stanley J. Watson at MBNI
Pritzker Neuropsychiatric Disorders Research Consortium website
Marijuana and Medicine: Assessing the Science Base on The National Academies Press website

American neuroscientists
University of Michigan faculty
Living people
Year of birth missing (living people)
Members of the National Academy of Medicine